is a professional Japanese baseball player. He plays pitcher for the Hanshin Tigers.

External links

 NPB.com

1983 births
Living people
Baseball people from Hiroshima Prefecture
Japanese baseball players
Ryukoku University alumni
Nippon Professional Baseball pitchers
Fukuoka SoftBank Hawks players
Hanshin Tigers players